Hartpury University and Hartpury College, formerly Hartpury College, is a provider of further and higher education which describes itself as specialising in the "agriculture, animal, equine, sport and veterinary nursing" sectors. The university and college is set in a 360-hectare estate located in Hartpury, near Gloucester, in Gloucestershire, England.

College
The college was established in the post-World War II era of the late 1940s, as an agricultural college with 50 students. The college remained relatively unchanged until 1990, when a rapid expansion programme started with the provision of a larger variety of further education courses.

Hartpury's link with the University of the West of England (UWE) began in 1997 when Hartpury was awarded Associate Faculty status. In 2017, Hartpury was granted ‘Taught Degree Awarding Powers’ (TDAP), and in the same year was awarded the Teaching Excellence Framework Gold award.

University
Hartpury College gained full university status in 2018 and changed its name to Hartpury University and Hartpury College. Today, the institution offers undergraduate and postgraduate courses to higher education level students based in the UK and overseas.

Accolades 
The university has received awards for its teaching provision, ranking as the number one English mainstream university for teaching in the National Student Survey (NSS) 2022, and in first place for lecturers and teaching quality at the Whatuni Student Choice Awards 2022.

Buildings
In the grounds of the college stands a Victorian bee shelter. The structure, known as a bee bole, is a Grade II* listed building.

Sport

Academies 
The institution has academies for sports including rugby, football, modern pentathlon, equine, rowing, netball and golf.

Rugby union 
Hartpury University and Hartpury College is known for its development of rugby players, with many former students playing at the highest level. It hosts Hartpury University R.F.C, which has an association with the professional club Gloucester Rugby, and Gloucester-Hartpury Women RFC, in partnership with the same club.

Rowing 
In 2010 Gloucester Rowing Club and Hartpury College set up a centre to enable Hartpury students to participate in one of the Great Britain's rowing team centres. Students are members of the Gloucester Rowing Club and can use its rowing facilities. In return the senior rowers from the club can use the training facilities at the college. The relationship has brought significant success at national and international level.

Alumni association
The college has an alumni association, with membership extending to former students from both Further and Higher Education programmes, as well as current and former members of staff.

2017 student expulsion
In June 2017 the college expelled one student and suspended several others following a police investigation into images circulated online and on social media depicting students from Hartpury College apparently killing a fox cub and posing with a dead cat. The College and Gloucestershire police both issued statements concluding they were satisfied the killing of the fox was not an act of cruelty, and that one of the students, who was training as a gamekeeper, had killed the animal to end its suffering after it had been hit by road traffic. The police declined to take further action.

References

External links
Hartpury University and Hartpury College

Hartpury College
University of the West of England, Bristol
Agricultural universities and colleges in the United Kingdom
Further education colleges in Gloucestershire
Educational institutions established in 1947
1947 establishments in England
Forest of Dean